Nakahoro Dam  is an earthfill dam located in Hokkaido Prefecture in Japan. The dam is used for flood control. The catchment area of the dam is 17.5 km2. The dam impounds about 48  ha of land when full and can store 2930 thousand cubic meters of water. The construction of the dam was started on 1971 and completed in 1990.

References

Dams in Hokkaido